Carquefou is a commune in the Loire-Atlantique, department in the region Pays de la Loire, in western France.

Population

Economy
The headquarters of the geophysical research company Sercel is located in Carquefou

Sport
In 2008, the local football team Union Sportive Jeanne d'Arc Carquefou reached the quarter finals of the French Cup after a win over the 8-times national champions Olympique de Marseille on March 19, putting the town in the national headlines.

See also
Communes of the Loire-Atlantique department

References

Communes of Loire-Atlantique